Adam Henderson may refer to:

 Adam Henderson (footballer) (1873–after 1901), English footballer
 Adam Henderson (fl. 1989–1995), British musician and founding member of Inkubus Sukkubus